Pan American World Airways, originally founded as Pan American Airways and commonly known as Pan Am, was an American airline that was the principal and largest international air carrier and unofficial overseas flag carrier of the United States for much of the 20th century. It was the first airline to fly worldwide and pioneered numerous innovations of the modern airline industry such as jumbo jets, and computerized reservation systems. Until its dissolution in 1991, Pan Am "epitomized the luxury and glamour of intercontinental travel", and it remains a cultural icon of the 20th century, identified by its blue globe logo ("The Blue Meatball"), the use of the word "Clipper" in its aircraft names and call signs, and the white uniform caps of its pilots.

Founded in 1927 by two former U.S. Army Air Corps majors, Pan Am began as a scheduled airmail and passenger service flying between Key West, Florida, and Havana, Cuba. Under the leadership of American entrepreneur Juan Trippe, in the 1930s the airline purchased a fleet of flying boats and focused its route network on Central and South America, gradually adding transatlantic and transpacific destinations. By the mid-20th century, Pan Am enjoyed a near monopoly on international routes. It led the aircraft industry into the Jet Age by acquiring new jetliners such as the Boeing 707 and Boeing 747. Pan Am's modern fleet allowed it to fly larger numbers of passengers, at a longer range, and with fewer stops than rivals. Its primary hub and flagship terminal was the Worldport at John F. Kennedy International Airport in New York City.

During its peak between the late 1950s and early 1970s, Pan Am was world-renowned for its advanced fleet, highly trained staff, and amenities. In 1970, it flew 11 million passengers to 86 countries, with destinations in every continent save Antarctica. In an era dominated by flag carriers that were wholly or majority-owned by governments, it became the unofficial national carrier of the United States. Pan Am was a founding member of the International Air Transport Association (IATA), the global airline industry association.

Beginning in the mid-1970s, Pan Am began facing a series of challenges both internal and external, along with rising competition from the deregulation of the airline industry in 1978. After several attempts at financial restructuring and rebranding throughout the 1980s, Pan Am gradually sold off its assets before declaring bankruptcy in 1991. By the time it ceased operations, the airline's trademark was the second most recognized worldwide, and its loss was felt among travelers and many Americans as signifying the end of the golden age of air travel. Its brand, iconography, and contributions to the industry remain well known in the 21st century. The airline's name and imagery were purchased in 1998 by railroad holding company Guilford Transportation Industries, which changed its name to Pan Am Systems and adopted Pan Am's logo.

History

Formation

Pan American Airways, Incorporated (PAA) was founded as a shell company on March 14, 1927, by United States Army Air Corps officers Henry "Hap" Arnold, Carl Spaatz and John Jouett out of concern for the growing influence of the German-owned Colombian air carrier SCADTA, in Central America. Operating in Colombia since 1920, SCADTA lobbied hard for landing rights in the Panama Canal Zone, ostensibly to survey air routes for a connection to the United States, which the Air Corps viewed as a precursor to a possible German aerial threat to the canal. In the spring of 1927, the United States Post Office requested bids on a contract to deliver mail from Key West, Florida to Havana, Cuba before 19 October 1927. Arnold and Spaatz drew up the prospectus for Pan American after they learned that SCADTA hired a company in Delaware to obtain air mail contracts from the US government.

Also competing for the contract, Juan Trippe formed the Aviation Corporation of the Americas (ACA) on June 2, 1927, with $250,000 in startup capital and the backing of powerful and politically connected financiers including Cornelius Vanderbilt Whitney and W. Averell Harriman. Their operation had the all-important landing rights for Havana, having acquired American International Airways, a small airline established in 1926 by John K. Montgomery and Richard B. Bevier as a seaplane service from Key West to Havana. A third company, Atlantic, Gulf, and Caribbean Airways, was established on October 11, 1927, by New York City investment banker Richard Hoyt to bid for the contract.

The Postal Service awarded Pan American Airways the US mail delivery contract to Cuba, at the end of the bidding process, but Pan American lacked any aircraft to perform the job and did not have landing rights in Cuba. Just days before the 19 October deadline, the three companies decided to form a partnership. ACA chartered a Fairchild FC-2 floatplane from a small Dominican Republic carrier, West Indian Aerial Express, allowing Pan Am to operate the first flight to Havana on 19 October 1927. The three companies formally merged on June 23, 1928. Richard Hoyt was named as president of the new Aviation Corporation of the Americas, but Trippe and his partners held 40% of the equity and Whitney was made president. Trippe became operational head of Pan American Airways, the new company's principal operating subsidiary.

The US government approved the original Pan Am's mail delivery contract with little objection, out of fears that SCADTA would have no competition in bidding for routes between Latin America and the United States. The government further helped Pan Am by insulating it from its US competitors, seeing the airline as the "chosen instrument" for US-based international air routes. The airline expanded internationally, benefiting from a virtual monopoly on foreign routes.

Trippe and his associates planned to extend Pan Am's network through all of Central and South America. During the late 1920s and early 1930s, Pan Am purchased a number of ailing or defunct airlines in Central and South America and negotiated with postal officials to win most of the government's airmail contracts to the region. In September 1929 Trippe toured Latin America with Charles Lindbergh to negotiate landing rights in a number of countries, including Barranquilla on SCADTA's home turf of Colombia, as well as Maracaibo and Caracas in Venezuela. By the end of the year, Pan Am offered flights along the west coast of South America to Peru. Following government favors for the denial of mail contracts to their competition, a forced merger was created with New York, Rio, and Buenos Aires Line, giving a seaplane route along the east coast of South America to Buenos Aires, Argentina, and westbound to Santiago, Chile. Its Brazilian subsidiary NYRBA do Brasil was later renamed as Panair do Brasil. Pan Am also partnered with the Grace Shipping Company in 1929 to form Pan American-Grace Airways, better known as Panagra, to gain a foothold to destinations in South America. In the same year, Pan Am acquired a controlling stake in Mexicana de Aviación and took over Mexicana's Ford Trimotor route between Brownsville, Texas and Mexico City, extending this service to the Yucatan Peninsula to connect with Pan Am's Caribbean route network.

Pan Am's holding company, the Aviation Corporation of the Americas, was one of the most sought after stocks on the New York Curb Exchange in 1929, and flurries of speculation surrounded each of its new route awards. In April 1929 Trippe and his associates reached an agreement with United Aircraft and Transport Corporation (UATC) to segregate Pan Am operations to the south of the Mexico – United States border, in exchange for UATC taking a large shareholder stake (UATC was the parent company of what are now Boeing, Pratt & Whitney, and United Airlines). The Aviation Corporation of the Americas changed its name to Pan American Airways Corporation in 1931.

Clipper era

Pan Am started its South American routes with Consolidated Commodore and Sikorsky S-38 flying boats. The  S-40,  larger than the eight-passenger S-38, began flying for Pan Am in 1931. Carrying the nicknames American Clipper, Southern Clipper, and Caribbean Clipper, they were the first of the series of 28 Clippers that symbolized Pan Am between 1931 and 1946. During this time, Pan Am operated Clipper services to Latin America from the International Pan American Airport at Dinner Key in Miami, Florida.

In 1937 Pan Am turned to Britain and France to begin seaplane service between the United States and Europe. Pan Am reached an agreement with both countries to offer service from Norfolk, Virginia, to Europe via Bermuda and the Azores using the S-42s. A joint service from Port Washington, New York, to Bermuda began in June 1937, with Pan Am using Sikorskys and Imperial Airways using the C class flying boat RMA Cavalier.

On July 5, 1937, survey flights across the North Atlantic began. Pan Am Clipper III, a Sikorsky S-42, landed at Botwood in the Bay of Exploits in Newfoundland from Port Washington, via Shediac, New Brunswick. The next day Pan Am Clipper III left Botwood for Foynes in County Limerick, Ireland. The same day, a Short Empire C-Class flying boat, the Caledonia, left Foynes for Botwood,  and landed July 6, 1937, reaching Montreal on July 8 and New York on July 9.

Trippe decided to start a service from San Francisco to Honolulu and on to Hong Kong and Auckland following steamship routes. After negotiating traffic rights in 1934 to land at Pearl Harbor, Midway Island, Wake Island, Guam, and Subic Bay (Manila), Pan Am shipped $500,000 worth of aeronautical equipment and construction crews westward in March 1935 using the S.S. North Haven,  a 15,000-ton merchant ship chartered for the purpose of provisioning each island that the clippers would stop at on their 4- to 5-day flight.  Pan Am ran its first survey flight to Honolulu in April 1935 with a Sikorsky S-42 flying boat. Construction crews, including Bill Mullahey who would later oversee Pan Am's Pacific operations, cleared coral from lagoons, constructed hotels, and installed the radio navigation equipment necessary for the clippers to island hop from Pearl City Seaplane Base, Hawaii, to Asia. The airline won the contract for a San Francisco–Canton mail route later that year and operated its first commercial flight carrying mail and express (no passengers) in a Martin M-130 from Alameda to Manila amid media fanfare on November 22, 1935. The five-leg,  flight arrived in Manila on November 29 and returned to San Francisco on December 6, cutting the time between the two cities by the fastest scheduled steamship by over two weeks. (Both the United States and Philippine Islands issued special stamps for the two flights.) The first passenger flight left Alameda on October 21, 1936. The fare from San Francisco to Manila or Hong Kong in 1937 was  one way (about $ in ) and US$1,710 round trip.

On August 6, 1937, Juan Trippe accepted United States aviation's highest annual prize, the Collier Trophy, on behalf of PAA from President Franklin D. Roosevelt for the company's "establishment of the transpacific airline and the successful execution of extended overwater navigation and the regular operations thereof."

 Pan Am also used Boeing 314 flying boats for the Pacific route: in China, passengers could connect to domestic flights on the Pan Am-operated China National Aviation Corporation (CNAC) network, co-owned with the Chinese government. Pan Am flew to Singapore for the first time in 1941, starting a semi-monthly service which reduced San Francisco–Singapore travel times from 25 days to six days.

Six large, long-range Boeing 314 flying boats were delivered to Pan Am in early 1939. On March 30, 1939, the Yankee Clipper, piloted by Harold E. Gray, made the first-ever trans-Atlantic passenger flight. The first leg of the flight, Baltimore to Horta, took 17 hours and 32 minutes and covered . The second leg from Horta to Pan Am's newly built airport in Lisbon took 7 hours and 7 minutes and covered . The Boeing 314 also enabled the start of scheduled weekly contract Foreign Air Mail (F.A.M. 18) service and later passenger flights from New York (Port Washington, L.I.) to both France and Britain. The Southern route to France was inaugurated for airmail on May 20, 1939, by the Yankee Clipper piloted by Arthur E. LaPorte flying via Horta, Azores, and Lisbon, Portugal to Marseilles. Passenger service over the route was added on June 28, 1939, by the Dixie Clipper piloted by R.O.D. Sullivan. The Eastbound trip departed every Wednesday at Noon and arrived at Marseilles on Friday at 3 pm GCT with return service leaving Marseilles on Sunday at 8 am and arriving at Port Washington on Tuesday at 7 am. The Northern transatlantic route to Britain was inaugurated for Air Mail service on June 24, 1939, by the Yankee Clipper piloted by Harold Gray flying via Shediac (New Brunswick), Botwood (Newfoundland), and Foynes (Ireland) to Southampton. Passenger service was added on the Northern route on July 8, 1939, by the Yankee Clipper. Eastbound flights left on Saturday at 7:30 am and arrived at Southampton on Sunday at 1 pm GCT. Westbound service departed Southampton on Wednesday at Noon and arrived at Port Washington on Thursday at 3 pm. After the outbreak of World War II in Europe on September 1, 1939, the terminus became Foynes until the service ceased for the winter on October 5 while transatlantic service to Lisbon via the Azores continued into 1941. During World War II, Pan Am flew over  worldwide in support of military operations.

The "Clippers" – the name hearkened back to the 19th century fast-sailing clippers – were the only American passenger aircraft of the time capable of intercontinental travel. To compete with ocean liners, the airline offered first-class seats on such flights, and the style of flight crews became more formal. Instead of being leather-jacketed, silk-scarved airmail pilots, the crews of the "Clippers" wore naval-style uniforms and adopted a set procession when boarding the aircraft. In 1940 Pan Am and TWA both received and began using the Boeing 307 Stratoliner, the first pressurized airliner to enter service. The Boeing 307's airline service was short-lived, as all were commandeered for military service when the United States entered World War II.

During World War II most Clippers were pressed into military service. A new Pan Am subsidiary pioneered an air military-supply route across the Atlantic from Brazil to West Africa. The onward flight to Sudan and Egypt tracked an existing British civil air route. In January 1942, the Pacific Clipper completed the first circumnavigation of the globe by a commercial airliner. Another first occurred in January 1943, when Franklin D. Roosevelt became the first US president to fly abroad, in the Dixie Clipper. During this period Star Trek creator Gene Roddenberry was a Clipper pilot; he was aboard the Clipper Eclipse when it crashed in Syria on June 19, 1947.

While waiting at Foynes, Ireland, for a Pan Am Clipper flight to New York in 1942, passengers were served a drink today known as Irish coffee by Chef Joe Sheridan.

Post-war expansion and modernization

The growing importance of air transport in the post-war era meant that Pan Am would no longer enjoy the official patronage it had been afforded in pre-war days to prevent the emergence of any meaningful competition, both at home and abroad.

Although Pan Am continued to use its political influence to lobby for protection of its position as America's primary international airline, it encountered increasing competition – first from American Export Airlines across the Atlantic to Europe, and subsequently from others including TWA to Europe, Braniff to South America, United to Hawaii and Northwest Orient to East Asia, as well as five potential rivals to Mexico. This changed situation resulted from the new post-war approach the Civil Aeronautics Board (CAB) took toward the promotion of competition between major US carriers on key domestic and international scheduled routes compared with pre-war US aviation policy.

American Overseas Airlines (AOA) was the first airline to begin regular landplane flights across the Atlantic, on October 24, 1945. In January 1946 Pan Am scheduled seven DC-4s a week east from LaGuardia Airport, five to London (Hurn Airport) and two to Lisbon. Time to Hurn was 17 hours 40 minutes including stops or 20 hours 45 minutes to Lisbon. A Boeing 314 flying boat flew LaGuardia to Lisbon once every two weeks in 29 hours 30 minutes; flying boat flights ended shortly thereafter.

TWA's transatlantic challenge – the impending introduction of its faster, pressurized Lockheed Constellations – resulted in Pan Am ordering its own Constellation fleet at $750,000 apiece. Pan Am began transatlantic Constellation flights on January 14, 1946, beating TWA by three weeks.

In January 1946, a flight from Miami to Buenos Aires took 71 hours and 15 minutes in a Pan Am DC-3, but the following summer DC-4s flew Idlewild to Buenos Aires in 38 hr 30 min. In January 1958 Pan Am's DC-7Bs flew New York to Buenos Aires in 25 hours 20 minutes, while the National – Pan Am – Panagra DC-7B via Panama and Lima took 22 hours 45 minutes. Convair 240s replaced DC-3s and other pre-war types on Pan Am's shorter flights in the Caribbean and South America. Pan Am also acquired a few Curtiss C-46s for a freight network that eventually extended to Buenos Aires.

In January 1946 Pan Am had no transpacific flights beyond Hawaii, but they soon resumed with DC-4s. In January 1958 the California to Tokyo flight was a daily Stratocruiser that took 31 hours 45 minutes from San Francisco or 32 hours 15 minutes from Los Angeles. (A flight to Seattle and a connection to Northwest's DC-7C totaled 24 hours 13 minutes from San Francisco, but Pan Am was not allowed to fly that route.) The Stratocruisers' double-deck fuselage with sleeping berths and a lower-deck lounge helped it compete with its rival. "Super Stratocruisers" with more fuel appeared on Pan Am's transatlantic routes in November 1954, making nonstop eastward and one-stop westward schedules more reliably.

In June 1947 Pan Am started the first scheduled round-the-world airline flight. In September the weekly DC-4 was scheduled to leave San Francisco at 2200 Thursday as Flight 1, stopping at Honolulu, Midway, Wake, Guam, Manila, Bangkok and arriving in Calcutta on Monday at 1245, where it met Flight 2, a Constellation that had left New York at 2330 Friday. The DC-4 returned to San Francisco as Flight 2; the Constellation left Calcutta 1330 Tuesday, stopped at Karachi, Istanbul, London, Shannon, Gander, and arrived LaGuardia Thursday at 1455. A few months later PA 3 took over the Manila route while PA 1 shifted to Tokyo and Shanghai. All Pan Am round-the-world flights included at least one change of plane until Boeing 707s took over in 1960. PA 1 became daily in 1962–63, making different en-route stops on different days of the week; in January 1963 it left San Francisco at 0900 daily and was scheduled into New York 56 hr 10 min later. Los Angeles replaced San Francisco in 1968; when Boeing 747s finished replacing 707s in 1971 all stops except Tehran and Karachi were served daily in each direction. For a year or so in 1975–76 Pan Am finally completed the round-the-world trip, New York to New York.

In January 1950 Pan American Airways Corporation officially became Pan American World Airways, Inc. (The airline had begun calling itself Pan American World Airways in 1943.) In September 1950 Pan Am completed the $17.45 million purchase of American Overseas Airlines from American Airlines. That month Pan Am ordered 45 Douglas DC-6Bs. The first, Clipper Liberty Bell (N6518C), inaugurated Pan Am's all-tourist class Rainbow service between New York and London on May 1, 1952, to complement the all-first President Stratocruiser service. From June 1954, DC-6Bs began replacing DC-4s on Pan Am's internal German routes.

Pan Am introduced the Douglas DC-7C "Seven Seas" on transatlantic routes in summer 1956. In January 1958 the DC-7C nonstop took 10 hours 45 minutes Idlewild to London, enabling Pan Am to hold its own against TWA's Super Constellations and Starliners. In 1957 Pan Am started DC-7C flights direct from the West Coast of the United States to London and Paris with a fuel stop in Canada or Greenland. The introduction of the faster Bristol Britannia turboprop by British Overseas Airways Corporation (BOAC) between New York and London from December 19, 1957, ended Pan Am's competitive leadership there.

In January 1958 Pan Am scheduled 47 flights a week east from Idlewild to Europe, Africa, the Middle East and beyond; the following August there were 65.

Jet age

Pan Am considered purchasing the world's first jetliner, the British De Havilland Comet, but instead waited to become Boeing 707 launch customer in 1955 with an order for 20. It also purchased 25 Douglas DC-8, which could seat six across. The 707 was originally to be 144 inches (3.66 m) wide with five-abreast seating but Boeing widened their design to match the DC-8. The combined order value was $269 million.

Pan Am's first scheduled jet flight was from New York Idlewild to Paris Le Bourget, stopping at Gander to refuel, on October 26, 1958. The Boeing 707-121 Clipper America N711PA carried 111 passengers.

320 "Intercontinental" series Boeing 707s delivered in 1959–60, and the Douglas DC-8 in March 1960, enabled non-stop transatlantic crossings with a viable payload in both directions.

Widebody era

Pan Am was a Boeing 747 launch customer, placing a $525 million order for 25 in April 1966.

On January 15, 1970 First Lady Pat Nixon christened Pan Am Boeing 747 Clipper Young America at Washington Dulles and during the next few days, Pan Am flew 747s to major airports in the United States where the public could tour them.

Pan Am's inaugural 747 service on the evening of January 21, 1970, was delayed for several hours by engine failure affecting the scheduled Clipper Young America. Clipper Victor was substituted for the flight from New York John F. Kennedy to London Heathrow. While on the tarmac at Heathrow, two students from Aston University boarded the aircraft undetected and distributed rag mags in the passenger accommodation as a publicity stunt.

Pan Am carried 11 million passengers over 20 billion miles (32 billion km) in 1970, the year it introduced widebodied airline travel.

Supersonic plans
Pan Am was one of the first three airlines to sign options for the Aérospatiale-BAC Concorde, but like other airlines that took out options – with the exception of BOAC and Air France – it did not purchase the supersonic jet. Pan Am was the first US airline to sign for the Boeing 2707, the American supersonic transport (SST) project, with 15 delivery positions reserved; these aircraft never saw service after Congress voted against additional funding in 1971.

Computerized reservations, Pan Am Building and Worldport

Pan Am commissioned IBM to build PANAMAC, a large computer that booked airline and hotel reservations, which was installed in 1964. It also held large amounts of information about cities, countries, airports, aircraft, hotels, and restaurants.

The computer occupied the fourth floor of the Pan Am Building, which was the largest commercial office building in the world for some time.

The airline also built Worldport, a terminal building at John F. Kennedy Airport in New York. It was distinguished by its elliptical, four-acre (16,000 m2) roof, suspended far from the outside columns of the terminal below by 32 sets of steel posts and cables. The terminal was designed to allow passengers to board and disembark via stairs without getting wet by parking the nose of the aircraft under the overhang. The introduction of the jetbridge made this feature obsolete. Pan Am built a gilded training building in the style of Edward Durell Stone designed by Steward-Skinner Architects in Miami.

Peak
At its peak in the late 1960s and early 1970s, Pan Am advertised under the slogan, the "World's Most Experienced Airline". It carried 6.7 million passengers in 1966, and by 1968, its 150 jets flew to 86 countries on every continent except for Antarctica over a scheduled route network of 81,410 unduplicated miles (131,000 km). During that period the airline was profitable and its cash reserves totaled $1 billion. Most routes were between New York, Europe, and South America, and between Miami and the Caribbean. In 1964 Pan Am began a helicopter shuttle between New York's John F. Kennedy, LaGuardia and Newark airports and Lower Manhattan, operated by New York Airways. Aside from the DC-8, the Boeing 707 and 747, the Pan Am jet fleet included Boeing 720Bs and 727s (the first aircraft to sport Pan Am – rather than Pan American – titles). The airline later had Boeing 737s and 747SPs (which could fly nonstop New York to Tokyo), Lockheed L-1011 Tristars, McDonnell-Douglas DC-10s, and Airbus A300s and A310s. Pan Am owned the InterContinental Hotel chain and had a financial interest in the Falcon Jet Corporation, which held marketing rights to the Dassault Falcon 20 business jet in North America. The airline was involved in creating a missile-tracking range in the South Atlantic and operating a nuclear-engine testing laboratory in Nevada. In addition, Pan Am participated in several notable humanitarian flights.

At its height Pan Am was well regarded for its modern fleet and experienced crews: cabin staff were multilingual and usually college graduates, hired from around the world, frequently with nursing training. Pan Am's onboard service and cuisine, inspired by Maxim's de Paris, were delivered "with a personal flair that has rarely been equaled."

Internal German Services (IGS) and other operations

From 1950 until 1990 Pan Am operated a comprehensive network of high-frequency, short-haul scheduled services between West Germany and West Berlin, first with Douglas DC-4s, then with DC-6Bs (from 1954) and Boeing 727s (from 1966). This had come about as a result of an agreement among the United States, the United Kingdom, France, and the Soviet Union at the end of World War II which prohibited Germany from having its own airlines and restricted the provision of commercial air services from and to Berlin to air transport providers headquartered in these four countries. Rising Cold War tensions between the Soviet Union and the three Western powers resulted in unilateral Soviet withdrawal from the quadripartite Allied Control Commission in 1948, culminating in the division of Germany the following year. The airline's West Berlin operation consistently accounted for more than half of the city's entire commercial air traffic during that period.

For years, more passengers boarded Pan Am flights at Berlin Tempelhof than at any other airport. Pan Am operated a Berlin crew base of mainly German flight attendants and American pilots to staff its IGS flights. The German National flight attendants were later taken over by Lufthansa when it acquired Pan Am's Berlin route authorities. Over the years other local flight attendant bases outside the US included London for intra-Europe and transatlantic flying, Krakow, Warsaw, Istanbul and Belgrade for intra-Europe flights, a Tel Aviv base solely staffing the daily Tel Aviv-Paris-Tel Aviv service, a Nairobi base solely staffing the Nairobi-Frankfurt-Nairobi service as well as Delhi and Bombay bases for India-Frankfurt flights.

Pan Am also operated Rest and Recreation (R&R) flights during the Vietnam War. These flights carried American service personnel for R&R leaves in Hong Kong, Tokyo, and other Asian cities.

Passenger traffic (1951–1989)

In August 1953 PAA scheduled passenger flights to 106 airports; in May 1968 to 122 airports; in November 1978 to 65 airports (plus a few freight-only airports); in November 1985 to 98 airports; in November 1991 to 46 airports (plus 14 more with only "Pan Am Express" prop flights).

Downturn

Fallout from 1973 oil crisis
Pan Am had invested in a large fleet of Boeing 747s expecting that air travel would continue to increase. It did not, as the introduction of many wide-bodies by Pan Am and its competitors coincided with an economic slowdown. Reduced air travel after the 1973 oil crisis made the overcapacity problem worse. Pan Am was vulnerable, with its high overheads as a result of a large decentralized infrastructure. High fuel prices and its many older, less fuel-efficient narrow-bodied airplanes increased the airline's operating costs. Federal route awards to other airlines, such as the Transpacific Route Case, further reduced the number of passengers Pan Am carried and its profit margins.

On September 23, 1974, a group of Pan Am employees published an advertisement in The New York Times to register their disagreement over federal policies which they felt were harming the financial viability of their employer. The ad cited discrepancies in airport landing fees, such as Pan Am paying $4,200 to land a plane in Sydney, while the Australian carrier, Qantas, paid only $178 to land a jet in Los Angeles. The ad also contended that the United States Postal Service was paying foreign airlines five times as much to carry US mail in comparison to Pan Am. Finally, the ad questioned why the Export-Import Bank of the United States loaned money to Japan, France, and Saudi Arabia at 6% interest while Pan Am paid 12%.

By the mid-1970s Pan Am had racked up $364 million of accumulated losses over a 10-year period, and its debts approached $1 billion. This threatened the airline with bankruptcy. Former American Airlines vice president of operations, William T. Seawell, who had replaced Najeeb Halaby as Pan Am president in 1972, began implementing a turnaround strategy: trimming the network by 25%, slashing the 40,000-strong workforce by 30% and cutting wages, introducing stringent economies and rescheduling debt, and reducing the size of the fleet. These measures aided by the use of tax-loss credits enabled Pan Am to avert financial collapse and return to profitability in 1977.

Attempts to build a US domestic network
Since the 1930s, Juan Trippe had coveted domestic routes for Pan Am. Through the late 1950s and early 1960s, and in the mid-1970s, there were talks of merging the airline with a domestic operator such as American Airlines, Eastern Air Lines, Trans World Airlines or United Airlines. As rival airlines convinced Congress that Pan Am would use its political clout to monopolize US air routes, the CAB repeatedly denied the airline permission to operate in the US, by growth or by a merger with another airline. Pan Am remained an American carrier operating international routes only (aside from Hawaii and Alaska). The last time Pan Am was permitted to merge with another airline prior to the deregulation of the US airline industry was in 1950, when it took over American Overseas Airlines from American Airlines. After deregulation in 1978, more US domestic airlines began competing with Pan Am internationally.

National Airlines takeover
To acquire domestic routes, Pan Am, under president Seawell, set its eyes on National Airlines. Pan Am wound up in a bidding war with Frank Lorenzo's Texas International that boosted National's stock price, but Pan Am was granted permission to buy National in 1980 in what was described as the "Coup of the Decade." The acquisition of National Airlines for $437 million further burdened Pan Am's balance sheet, already under strain after financing the Boeing 747s ordered in the mid-1960s. This acquisition did little to improve Pan Am's competitive position in relation to nimbler, lower-cost competitors in a deregulated industry, as National's north–south route structure provided insufficient feed at Pan Am's transatlantic and transpacific gateways in New York and Los Angeles. The airlines had incompatible fleets (apart from the Boeing 727) and corporate cultures (partly as a result of National being perceived by some Pan Am employees as mainly a regional "backwoods" carrier with few trunk routes), and the integration was poorly handled by Pan Am management who presided over an increase in labor costs as a result of harmonizing National's pay scales with Pan Am's. Although revenues increased by 62% from 1979 to 1980, fuel costs from the merger increased by 157% during a weak economic climate. Further "miscellaneous expenses" increased by 74%.

Disposal of non-core assets and operational cutbacks
As 1980 progressed and the airline's financial situation worsened, Seawell began selling Pan Am's non-core assets. The first asset to be sold off was the airline's 50% interest in Falcon Jet Corporation in August. Later in November, Pan Am sold the Pan Am Building to the Metropolitan Life Insurance Company for $400 million. In September 1981 Pan Am sold off its InterContinental hotels chain. Before this transaction closed, Seawell was replaced by C. Edward Acker, Air Florida's founder and ex-president as well as a former Braniff International executive. The combined sale value of the InterContinental chain and the Falcon Jet Corp stake was $500 million.

Acker followed up the asset disposal program he had inherited from his predecessor with operational cutbacks. Most prominent among these was the discontinuation of the round-the world service from October 31, 1982, when Pan Am ceased flying between Delhi, Bangkok and Hong Kong due to the sector's unprofitability. To provide additional seating capacity for its 1983 spring/summer season, the airline also acquired three passenger Boeing 747-200Bs from Flying Tigers, who took four of Pan Am's 747-100 freighters in return.

Fleet restructuring
Despite Pan Am's precarious financial situation, in summer 1984 Acker went ahead with an order for new Airbus models in wide body and narrow-bodied aircraft, becoming the second American company to order Airbus aircraft, after Eastern Air Lines. These advanced aircraft, economically and operationally superior to the 747s and 727s Pan Am operated at the time, were intended to make the airline more competitive. In 1985, new A310-221s began replacing 727s on the Internal German Services (IGS) and A300s flew in the Caribbean networks later the same year. From early 1986, additional new longer range A310-222s replaced some of the 747s on the slimmed-down transatlantic network following ETOPS certification (approval by the Federal Aviation Administration (FAA) of transoceanic flying with twin-engined aircraft). The first A310 ETOPS transatlantic route was New York to Hamburg, Detroit to London followed shortly after that. Pan Am's decision not to take delivery of the A320s and to sell its delivery positions to Braniff meant that the majority of its short-haul US domestic and European feeder routes, and most of its IGS services, continued to be flown with obsolete 727s until the airline's demise. This put it at a disadvantage against rivals operating state-of-the-art aircraft with greater passenger appeal. In September 1984, Pan American World Airways created a holding company called Pan Am Corporation to assume ownership and control of the airline and the services division.

Sale of Pacific division 
Given the airline's dire state, in April 1985, Acker sold Pan Am's entire Pacific Division, which consisted of 25% of its entire route system and their major hub at Tokyo Narita International Airport to United Airlines for $750 million. This sale also enabled Pan Am to address fleet incompatibility issues related to the earlier acquisition of National Airlines as it included Pan Am's Pratt & Whitney JT9D-powered 747SPs, its Rolls-Royce RB211-powered L-1011-500s and the General Electric CF6-powered DC-10s inherited from National, which were transferred to United along with the Pacific routes. The sale came the same year as a month-long strike held by the Transport Workers Union of America.

Establishment of local feeder networks
In the early 1980s, Pan Am contracted several regional airlines (Air Atlanta, Colgan Air, Emerald Air, Empire Airlines, Presidential Airways and Republic Airlines) to operate feeder flights under the Pan Am Express branding.

The acquisition of Pennsylvania-based commuter airline Ransome Airlines for $65 million (which was finalized in 1987) was meant to address the issue of providing additional feed for Pan Am's mainline services at its hubs in New York, Los Angeles and Miami in the United States, and Berlin in Germany. The renamed Pan Am Express operated routes mostly from New York, as well as Berlin, Germany. Miami services were added in 1990. However, the regional Pan Am Express operation provided only an incremental feed to Pan Am's international route system, which was now focused on the Atlantic Division.

US East coast shuttle
In an attempt to gain a presence on the busy Washington–New York–Boston commuter air corridor, the Ransome acquisition was accompanied by the $100 million purchase of New York Air's shuttle service between Boston, New York, and Washington, D.C. This parallel move was intended to enable Pan Am to provide a high-frequency service for high-yield business travelers in direct competition with the long-established, successful Eastern Air Lines Shuttle operation. The renamed Pan Am Shuttle began operating out of LaGuardia Airport's refurbished historic Marine Air Terminal in October 1986. However, it did not address the pressing issue of Pan Am's continuing lack of a strong domestic feeder network.

Financial, operational and reputational setbacks
In 1987, Towers Financial Corporation, led by its CEO Steven Hoffenberg and his consultant Jeffrey Epstein, unsuccessfully tried to take over Pan Am in a corporate raid with Towers Financial as their raiding vessel. Their bid failed.

Thomas G. Plaskett, a former American Airlines and Continental executive, replaced Acker as president in January 1988 (joining Pan Am from the latter). While a program to refurbish Pan Am aircraft and improve the company's on-time performance began showing positive results (in fact, Pan Am's most profitable quarter ever was the third quarter of 1988), on December 21, 1988, the bombing of Pan Am flight 103 above Lockerbie, Scotland, resulted in 270 fatalities. Faced with a $300 million lawsuit filed by more than 100 families of the victims, the airline subpoenaed records of six US government agencies, including the CIA, the Drug Enforcement Administration, and the State Department. Though the records suggested that the US government was aware of warnings of a bombing and failed to pass the information to the airline, the families claimed Pan Am was attempting to shift the blame.

Also, in December 1988 the FAA fined Pan Am for 19 security failures, out of the 236 that were detected amongst 29 airlines.

Failed bid for Northwest Airlines
In June 1989, Plaskett presented Northwest Airlines with a $2.7 billion takeover bid that was backed by Bankers Trust, Morgan Guaranty Trust, Citicorp and Prudential-Bache. The proposed merger was Pan Am's final attempt to create a strong domestic network to provide sufficient feed for the two remaining mainline hubs at New York JFK and Miami. It was also intended to help the airline regain its status as a global airline by re-establishing a sizable transpacific presence. The merger was expected to result in annual savings of $240 million. However,  billionaire financier Al Checchi outbid Pan Am by presenting Northwest's directors with a superior proposal.

Fallout from 1990–91 Persian Gulf War
The first Gulf War triggered by the Iraqi invasion of Kuwait on August 2, 1990, caused fuel prices to rise, which severely depressed global economic activity. This in turn caused a sharp contraction of worldwide air travel demand, plunging once profitable operations, including Pan Am's prime transatlantic routes, into steep losses. These unforeseen events constituted a further major blow to Pan Am, which was still reeling from the 1988 Lockerbie disaster. To shore up its finances, Pan Am sold most of its routes serving London Heathrow – arguably Pan Am's most important international destination – to United Airlines. This left Pan Am with only two daily London flights, serving Detroit and Miami, which used Gatwick as their London terminal from the start of the 1990/91 winter timetable. Further asset disposals included Pan Am's sale of its IGS routes to Berlin to Lufthansa for $150 million, which became effective at the same time and brought the total value of asset disposals to $1.2 billion. These measures were accompanied by the elimination of 2,500 jobs (8.6% of its work force). These cutbacks were announced by the airline in September 1990.

Bankruptcy

Pan Am was forced to file for bankruptcy protection on January 8, 1991. Delta Air Lines purchased the remaining profitable assets of Pan Am, including its remaining European routes (except one from Miami to Paris), and Frankfurt mini hub, the Shuttle operation, 45 jets, and the Pan Am Worldport at John F. Kennedy Airport, for $416 million.  Delta also injected $100 million becoming a 45 percent owner of a reorganized but smaller Pan Am serving the Caribbean, Central and South America from a main hub in Miami. The airline's creditors would hold the other 55 percent.

The Boston–New York LaGuardia–Washington National Pan Am Shuttle service was taken over by Delta in September 1991. Two months later Delta assumed all of Pan Am's remaining transatlantic traffic rights, except Miami to Paris and London.

In October 1991, former Douglas Aircraft executive Russell Ray, Jr., was hired as Pan Am's new president and CEO. As part of this restructuring, Pan Am relocated its headquarters from the Pan Am Building in New York City to new offices in the Miami area in preparation for the airline's relaunch from both Miami and New York on November 1. The new airline would have operated approximately 60 aircraft and generated about $1.2 billion in annual revenues with 7,500 employees. Following the relaunch, Pan Am continued to sustain heavy losses. Revenue throughout October and November 1991 fell short of what had been anticipated in the reorganization plan, with Delta claiming that Pan Am was losing $3 million a day. This undermined Delta's, Wall Street's and the traveling public's confidence in the viability of the reorganized Pan Am.

Pan Am's senior executives outlined a projected shortfall of between $100 million and possibly $200 million, with the airline requiring a $25 million installment just to fly through the following week. On the evening of December 3, Pan Am's Creditors Committee advised US Bankruptcy Judge Cornelius Blackshear that it was close to convincing an airline (TWA) to invest $15 million to keep Pan Am operating. A deal with TWA owner Carl Icahn could not be struck. Pan Am opened for business at 9:00 am and within the hour, Ray was forced to withdraw Pan Am's plan of reorganization and execute an immediate shutdown plan for Pan Am.

Pan Am ceased operations on December 4, 1991, following a decision by Delta CEO Ron Allen and other senior executives not to go ahead with the final $25 million payment Pan Am was scheduled to receive the weekend after Thanksgiving. As a result, some 7,500 Pan Am employees lost their jobs, thousands of whom had worked in the New York City area and were preparing to move to the Miami area to work at Pan Am's new headquarters near Miami International Airport. Economists predicted that 9,000 jobs in the Miami area, including jobs at companies not connected to Pan Am that were dependent on the airline's presence, would be lost after it folded. The carrier's last flown scheduled operation was Pan Am flight 436 which departed that day from Bridgetown, Barbados, at 2 pm (EST) for Miami under the command of Captain Mark Pyle flying Clipper Goodwill, a Boeing 727-200 (N368PA).

Delta was sued for more than $2.5 billion on December 9, 1991, by the Pan Am Creditors Committee. Shortly thereafter, a large group of former Pan Am employees sued Delta. In December 1994, a federal judge ruled in favor of Delta, concluding that it was not liable for Pan Am's demise.

Pan Am was the third American major airline to shut down in 1991, after Eastern Air Lines and Midway Airlines.

After serving only two months as Pan Am's CEO, Ray was replaced by Peter McHugh to supervise the sale of Pan Am's remaining assets by Pan Am's Creditor's Committee. Pan Am's last remaining hub (at Miami International Airport) was split during the following years between United Airlines and American Airlines. TWA's Carl Icahn purchased Pan Am Express at a court ordered bankruptcy auction for $13 million, renaming it Trans World Express. The Pan Am brand was sold to Charles Cobb, CEO of Cobb Partners and former United States Ambassador to the Republic of Iceland under President George H.W. Bush and Under Secretary of the US Department of Commerce under President Reagan. Cobb, along with Hanna-Frost partners invested in a new Pan American World Airways headed by veteran airline executive Martin R. Shugrue, Jr, a former Pan Am executive with 20 years of experience at the original carrier.

In his book, Pan Am: An Aviation Legend, Barnaby Conrad III contends that the collapse of the original Pan Am was a combination of corporate mismanagement, government indifference to protecting its prime international carrier, and flawed regulatory policy. He cites an observation made by former Pan Am Vice President for External Affairs, Stanley Gewirtz:

Under the terms of bankruptcy, the airline's International Flight Academy in Miami was permitted to remain open. It was established as an independent training organization beginning in 1992 under its current name, Pan Am International Flight Academy. The company began operating by using the flight simulation and type rating training center of the defunct Pan Am. In 2006, American Capital Strategies invested $58 million into the academy. Owned by the parent of Japanese airline All Nippon Airways as of October 2014, Pan Am International Flight Academy is the only surviving division of Pan American World Airways.

Reuse of name
Aside from the aforementioned flight academy, the Pan Am brand has been resurrected six times since 1991, but the reincarnations were related to the original Pan Am in name only.

Airlines
Pan American World Airways trademarks and some assets were purchased by Eclipse Holdings, Inc., at an auction by the US Bankruptcy Court on December 2–3, 1993. The scheduled airline rights were sold to Pan American Airways on December 20–29, 1993, by Eclipse Holdings, which was to retain the Pan Am charter rights and operate through its subsidiary, Pan Am Charters, Inc., now Airways Corporation.

The first reincarnation of the original Pan Am operated from 1996 to 1998, with a focus on low-cost, long-distance flights between the United States and the Caribbean with the IATA airline designator PN. Eclipse Holdings (Pan Am II) later rescinded the Asset Purchase Agreement for cause and issued a cease and desist in January 1996, affecting all downstream transactions thereafter (as noted in US DOT proceeding OST-99-5945, and SEC 10-Q dated August 24, 1997, Plan of Reorganization (S.D. FL), and others).

The second was unrelated to the first and was a small regional carrier based in Portsmouth, New Hampshire, that operated between 1998 and 2004. It found its niche in operating usually at smaller airports near major ones, such as Pease International (Portsmouth), and Gary Municipal Airport in Indiana. It used the IATA code PA, and the ICAO code PAA.

Boston-Maine Airways, a sister company of the second reincarnation, operated the "Pan Am Clipper Connection" brand from 2004 to February 2008. A domestic airline in the Dominican Republic, descended from the company's first reincarnation, traded until March 23, 2012, as Pan Am Dominicana.

In November 2010, Pan American Airways, Incorporated, was resurrected for the fifth time by World-Wide Consolidated Logistics, Inc. The reincarnated operator is based at Brownsville/South Padre Island International Airport in Brownsville, Texas. The airline's inaugural flight was to Monterrey, Mexico, on November 12, 2010. The airline had said it would carry cargo only at first but intended to announce passenger service by 2011. Due to serious legal charges that were laid against the company's CEO Robert L. Hedrick in 2012, including child pornography charges for which he was eventually convicted, the company lost its bid with the FAA to pursue passenger or cargo flights of any kind.

Railways

In 1998, Guilford Transportation Industries purchased Pan American World Airways and all related naming rights and intellectual properties. The railway was later operated as Pan Am Railways. In 2022, the company was acquired by CSX Corporation.

Apparel 
Korean fashion company SJ Group opened a Pan Am flagship store in Seoul in 2022 after acquiring a license to produce Pan Am-branded apparel and accessories.

Record-setting flights
At the outbreak of the war in the Pacific in December 1941, the Pacific Clipper was en route to New Zealand from San Francisco. Rather than risk flying back to Honolulu and being shot down by Japanese fighters, it was directed to fly west to New York. Starting on December 8, 1941, at Auckland, New Zealand, the Pacific Clipper covered over 31,500 miles (50,694 km) via such exotic locales as Surabaya, Karachi, Bahrain, Khartoum and Leopoldville. The Pacific Clipper landed at Pan American's LaGuardia Field seaplane base at 7:12 on the morning of January 6, 1942, completing the first commercial plane flight to circumnavigate the world.

During the mid-1970s, Pan Am set two round-the-world records. Liberty Bell Express, a Boeing 747SP-21 named Clipper Liberty Bell, broke the commercial round-the-world record set by a Flying Tiger Line Boeing 707 with a new record of 46 hours, 50 seconds. The flight left New York-JFK on May 1, 1976, and returned on May 3. The flight stopped only in New Delhi and Tokyo, where a strike among the airport workers delayed it two hours. The flight beat the Flying Tiger Line's record by 16 hours 24 minutes.

In 1977, to commemorate its 50th birthday, Pan Am organized Flight 50, a round-the-world flight from San Francisco to San Francisco, this time over the North Pole and the South Pole with stops in London Heathrow, Cape Town Airport and Auckland Airport. 747SP-21 Clipper New Horizons was the former Liberty Bell, making the plane the only one to go around the globe over the Equator and the poles. The flight made it in 54 hours, 7 minutes, and 12 seconds, creating seven new world records certified by the FAI. Captain Walter H. Mullikin, who commanded this flight, also commanded the Liberty Bell Express flight.

Corporate affairs
For much of its history the corporate headquarters were the Pan Am Building in Midtown Manhattan, New York City.

When Juan Trippe had the company offices relocated to New York City, he rented space in a building on 42nd Street. This facility was across from the Grand Central Terminal. From a period in the 1930s until 1963, the airline headquarters were in the Chrysler Building on 135 East 42nd Street, also in Midtown Manhattan.

In September 1960 Trippe and developer Erwin Wolfson signed a $115,500,000 lease agreement for the airline to occupy  worth of space for the headquarters, totaling about 15 floors, and a new main ticket office at the intersection of 45th Street and Vanderbilt Avenue. At the time, the 30-year lease in the Chrysler Building was nearing the end of its life. The new lease was scheduled for 25 years.

In popular culture
Pan Am held a lofty position in the popular culture of the Cold War era. One of the most famous images in which a Pan Am plane formed a backdrop was the Beatles' February 7, 1964, arrival at John F. Kennedy Airport aboard a Pan Am Boeing 707-321, Clipper Defiance.

From 1964 to 1968, con artist Frank Abagnale, Jr., claims to have masqueraded as a Pan Am pilot while still a minor, dead-heading to many destinations in the cockpit jump seat. He also claims to have used Pan Am's preferred hotels, paid the bills with bogus checks, and later cashed fake payroll checks in Pan Am's name. Abagnale and his co-author Stan Redding documented this era in the memoir Catch Me if You Can, which became a film in 2002. Abagnale called Pan Am the "Ritz-Carlton of airlines", and noted that the days of luxury in airline travel were over. In 2021 however, journalist Alan C. Logan asserts that Frank Abagnale's claims were for the most part fabrications. Logan claims that Abagnale spent most of his late teenage years in prison, and had only written a handful of false Pan Am checks that were rapidly detected as false, and landed him back in prison.

In August 1964, Pan Am accepted the reservation of Gerhard Pistor, a journalist from Vienna, Austria, as the first passenger for future flights to the Moon. He paid a deposit of 500 Austrian Schillings (roughly US$20 at the time). About 93,000 people followed on the Pan Am waiting list, called "First Moon Flights Club". Pan Am expected the flight to depart about 2000.

A fictional Pan Am "Space Clipper", a commercial spaceplane called the Orion III, had a prominent role in Stanley Kubrick's 1968 film 2001: A Space Odyssey and was featured prominently in one of the movie's posters. Plastic models of the 2001 Pan Am Space Clipper were sold by both the Aurora Company and Airfix at the time of the film's release in 1968. A satire of the movie by Mad magazine in 1968 showed Pan Am female flight attendants in "Actionwear by Monsanto" outfits as they joked about the problems their passengers faced while vomiting in zero gravity. The film's sequel, 2010, also featured Pan Am in a background television commercial in the home of David Bowman's widow with the slogan, "At Pan Am, the sky is no longer the limit."

The airline appeared in other movies, notably in several James Bond films. The company's Boeing 707s were featured in Dr. No (1962) and From Russia with Love (1963), while a Pan Am 747 and the Worldport appeared in the 1973 film Live and Let Die.

A term used in popular psychology is "Pan American (or Pan Am) Smile." Named after the smile stewardesses gave to passengers in the airline's television commercials. It consists of a perfunctory mouth movement without the activity of facial muscles around the eyes that characterizes a genuine smile.

The 1982 film Blade Runner contains several prominent shots of advertisements for Pan Am. The 2017 sequel, Blade Runner 2049 also shows a Pan Am sign in an establishing shot.

In 2011, ABC announced a new television series based on the lives of a 1960s Pan Am flight crew. The series, titled Pan Am, began airing in September 2011. It was canceled in May 2012.

In 2020, Funko Games released a Pan Am board game, in which players play as airlines in competition with Pan Am.

Flight crews

Critical to Pan Am's success as an airline was the proficiency of its flight crews, who were rigorously trained in long-distance flight, seaplane anchorage and berthing operations, over-water navigation, radio procedure, aircraft repair, and marine tides. During the day, use of the compass while judging drift from sea currents was normal procedure; at night, all flight crews were trained to use celestial navigation. In bad weather, pilots used dead reckoning and timed turns, making successful landings at fogged-in harbors by landing out to sea, then taxiing the plane into port. Many pilots had merchant marine certifications and radio licenses as well as pilot certificates.

A Pan Am flight captain would normally begin his career years earlier as a radio operator or even mechanic, steadily gaining his licenses and working his way up the flight crew roster to navigator, second officer, and first officer. Before World War II, it was not unusual for a captain to make engine repairs at remote locations.

Pan Am's mechanics and support staff were similarly trained. Newly hired applicants were frequently paired with experienced flight mechanics in several areas of the company until they had achieved proficiency in all aircraft types. Emphasis was placed on learning to maintain and overhaul aircraft in harsh seaborne environments when faced with logistical difficulties, as might be expected in a small foreign port without an aviation infrastructure or even an adequate road network. Many crews supported repair operations by flying in spare parts to planes stranded overseas, in some cases performing repairs themselves.

Acquisitions and divestments

 1927: Pan American Airways, Atlantic, Gulf, and Caribbean Airways, and Aviation Corporation of the Americas founded.
 1928: All three precursor firms merge into Aviation Corporation of the Americas, with Pan American Airways as its brand.
 1928: 50% interest of Peruvian Airways acquired by Pan American.
 1929: Mexicana of Mexico acquired by Pan Am.
 1929: Pan American-Grace Airways (PANAGRA), operating on the west coast of South America, formed as a 50–50 joint venture with W. R. Grace and Company.
 1930: New York, Rio, and Buenos Aires Line (NYRBA) acquired, allowing Pan Am to operate along the east coast of South America. NYRBA's Brazilian subsidiary is renamed Panair do Brasil.
 1931: Majority control of SCADTA of Colombia acquired in secret.
 1931: Pacific Alaska Airways formed.
 1931: Boston-Maine Airways begins contract operations.
 1932: Aerovias Centrales, S.A. formed.
 1932: Cubana of Cuba acquired.
 1932: Uraba, Medellin and Central Airways acquired.
 1933: China National Aviation Corporation (CNAC) acquired.
 1933: Servicios Aviacion de Guatemala acquired.
 1933: Panama Airways acquired.
 1937: CNAC merged with China Airways.
 1940: Minority holders of SCADTA bought-out.
 1940: Aerovías de Guatemala formed.
 1940: 40% of Aeronaves de Mexico acquired.
 1941: SCADTA merged into SACO to form Avianca, owned by the Colombian government.
 1943: Aerovías Venezolanas, S.A. (AVENSA) of Venezuela founded as a joint venture.
 1943: 45% interest of Bahamas Airways acquired.
 1944: Cuban investors acquire 56% of Cubana through a stock float.
 1945: SAHSA was founded, being owned 40% of Pan Am, 40% of the Honduran Government, and 20% from private carriers.
 1946: InterContinental, a chain of hotels, founded.
 1946: Brazilian investors bought 4% of Panair do Brasil, with Pan Am's share decreased to 48%.
 1949: Pan Am acquires a stake in Middle East Airlines (MEA), as well as a management contract.
 1949: Pan Am's 20% stake in CNAC acquired by Chinese Nationalists, with assets split variously between the Nationalists and the People's Republic of China.
 1950: American Overseas Airlines (AOA) acquired from American Airlines.
 1954: Pan Am receives a contract to operate Patrick Air Force Base.
 1954: Cuban government acquires Pan Am's remaining stake in Cubana.
 1955: Pan Am's 49% stake in MEA is sold to British Overseas Airways Corporation (BOAC).
 1959: Mexican government acquires Pan Am's stake in Mexicana and Aeronaves de México (later renamed Aeroméxico).
 1961: Brazilian investors acquires all the Pan Am's share in Panair do Brasil.

 1967: PANAGRA sold to Braniff International Airways.
 1970: Pan Am's 40% stake in SAHSA acquired by Transportes Aéreos Nacionales (TAN).
 1976: AVENSA stake divested to Venezuelan government.
 1980: National Airlines acquired.
 1981: Pan Am Building sold to MetLife.
 1981: InterContinental sold to Grand Metropolitan.
 1986: Pacific Division sold to United Airlines.
 1988: Pan Am's queue for 50 A320 sold to Braniff Inc.
 1989: Pan Am World Services (PAWS) sold to Johnson Controls.
 1990: London–Heathrow-based routes sold to United Airlines.
 1990: Internal German Services Division sold to Lufthansa.
 1991: Atlantic Division, Pan Am Shuttle, and New York City Worldport sold to Delta Air Lines.

Accidents and incidents

Fleet

Fleet in 1990
The following were aircraft operated Pan Am and Pan Am Express in March 1990, a year and a half before the airline's collapse:

Fleet history
All the aircraft ever operated by Pan Am:

Destinations

See also

 Pan Am Air Bridge
 Pan American Airways Guided Missile Range Division

Notes

Citations

Sources
 
 
 
 Clausen, Meredith. The Pan Am Building and the Shattering of the Modernist Dream. MIT Press, 2005. , 9780262033244.
 
 

 
 
 
  
 
 

 
 
 
 
  (Aviation News online)

Further reading
  (Aviation News online)
  (Kelsey Publishing Group online)

External links

 Pan Am Brands
 Pan Am Historical Foundation
 Pan American World Airways, Inc. Records – University of Miami, Special Collections
 The Pan Am Museum Foundation, Inc. 
 everythingPanAm.com – a virtual Pan Am museum
 PanAmAir.org – a site working to preserve the memories of Pan Am
 
Old photographs of Pan Am aircraft and advertisements

 
Defunct airlines of the United States
Airlines established in 1927
Airlines disestablished in 1991
History of Key West, Florida
Landmarks in Key West, Florida
Collier Trophy recipients
American companies established in 1927
American companies disestablished in 1991
Defunct seaplane operators